Ako nisam dobra, šta ćemo onda? (And If I'm Not Good, What Do We Do?) is the sixth studio album by the Serbian indie/alternative rock band Obojeni Program released by the Serbian independent record label UrbaNS in 2001.

Track listing 
All music and lyrics by Obojeni Program.

Personnel 
The band
 Branislav Babić "Kebra" — vocals
 Tamara Dobler — vocals, backing vocals
 Dragan Knežević — guitar, backing vocals
 Mirko Topalski — drums
 Zoran Geratović — bass guitar
 Miloš Romić — DJ

Additional personnel
 Saša Mihajlović  — design, photography
 Vlada Žeželj — recorded by
 Ilija Vlaisavljević "Bebec" — production

References 
 Ako nisam dobra, šta ćemo onda? at Discogs
 EX YU ROCK enciklopedija 1960-2006, Janjatović Petar; 
 NS rockopedija, novosadska rock scena 1963-2003, Mijatović Bogomir, SWITCH, 2005

Obojeni Program albums
2001 albums